Phoenix Arms is a firearms manufacturer established in 1992. A predecessor company owned by George Jennings, Raven Arms, ceased operations in 1991, after which Jennings retired and sold his designs to Phoenix. Phoenix was founded and owned by Jennings’ ex-wife, his children, four of his grandchildren, and by Raven's former general manager. Phoenix is described by the U.S. BATF as one of the "Ring of Fire" companies, known for producing inexpensively-manufactured firearms often given the pejorative term "Saturday night special".

Phoenix initially continued production of the MP-25, Raven's flagship model, before later replacing it with two new pistols, the HP22A and HP25A, chambered in .22 LR and .25 ACP, respectively. The pistols are constructed of injection-molded Zamak, a zinc alloy.

Products

HP22 and HP25

The HP22A and HP25A are small semi-automatic pocket pistols chambered in the .22 Long Rifle or .25 ACP cartridge, respectively. They are blowback-operated pistols and come with 3 inch barrels. Optional 5 inch barrels are available. The frame is zinc alloy with a steel barrel and alloy slide. They are single-action pistols. The HP22 feeds from a single-stack 10-round magazine, and the HP25 feeds from a single-stack 9-round magazine. They have a unique slide-mounted firing pin block in addition to a regular manual safety. The pistol includes a magazine disconnect feature, which prevents the gun from firing without a magazine. The magazine cannot be removed without engaging the manual safety. The HP22A and HP25A have a shotgun-style ventilated rib along the top and feature a blade front sight with windage-adjustable notch-type rear sight. They are available in nickel- or blued finish. The HP22 is designed for use with standard-velocity .22 Long Rifle only.

Accessories
Phoenix Arms also markets a "Target Kit" for the HP22A/HP25A that includes an interchangeable 5 inch barrel and a magazine with an extended finger rest.

References

External links
 
 Phoenix Arms Website

Firearm manufacturers of the United States
Manufacturing companies based in California
Companies based in San Bernardino County, California
Ontario, California
Manufacturing companies established in 1992
1992 establishments in California